Józef Jaworski (19 October 1903 – 1 September 1939) was a Polish middle-distance runner. He competed in the men's 800 metres at the 1924 Summer Olympics. He was killed in action during World War II.

References

External links
 

1903 births
1939 deaths
Athletes (track and field) at the 1924 Summer Olympics
Athletes (track and field) at the 1928 Summer Olympics
Polish male middle-distance runners
Olympic athletes of Poland
People from Zgierz
Sportspeople from Łódź Voivodeship
People from Piotrków Governorate
Polish people of the Polish–Soviet War
Polish military personnel killed in World War II